Ministry of Energy (Polish: Ministerstwo Energii) is the office of government in Poland responsible for energy policy and the management of mineral deposits. Krzysztof Tchórzewski is the current Minister of Energy. It was created in late 2015 from the split of the Ministry of Infrastructure and Development.

Footnotes

External links
 

Poland
Government ministries of Poland
2015 establishments in Poland
Ministries established in 2015